The 2011 African Handball Cup Winners' Cup was the 27th edition, organized by the African Handball Confederation, under the auspices of the International Handball Federation, the handball sport governing body. The tournament was held from April 14–22, 2011 at the Palais Polyvalent des Sports de Warda in Yaoundé, Cameroon, contested by 8 teams and won by Zamalek Sporting Club of Egypt.

Draw

Preliminary rounds
Times given below are in WAT UTC+1.

Group A

* Note:  Advance to semi-finals Relegated to 5th place classification Relegated to 7th place classification

Group B

* Note:  Advance to semi-finals Relegated to 5th place classification Relegated to 7th place classification

Knockout stage
Championship bracket

5-8th bracket

Final standings

Awards

References

External links
 Tournament profile at goalzz.com
 General calendar - cahbonline
 Results - cahbonline

African Handball Cup Winners' Cup
Cup Winners' Cup